Lino Zanon is an Italian biathlete and ski mountaineer who competed in the 1960s and 1970s. He is currently member of the Sci Club Bravi–Masetto.

Selected results 
Zanon also participated in the 20 km event of the Biathlon World Championships 1971, where he placed 48th.

 1970: 1st, Italian championships of biathlon
 1971:
 1st, Italian championships of biathlon, large calibre
 4th, Trofeo Mezzalama, together with Willy Bertin and Felice Darioli
 1972: 2nd, Italian championships of biathlon
 1973:
 2nd, Italian championships of biathlon
 2nd, Trofeo Mezzalama, together with Willy Bertin and Felice Darioli

References

External links 
 Photos, 25° corso "Latemar II", Scuola Alpina Guardia di Finanza

20th-century births
Living people
Year of birth missing (living people)
Italian male biathletes
Italian male ski mountaineers